The Winnipeg Jets were an ice hockey team who played in both the National Hockey League (NHL) and the World Hockey Association (WHA). This is a list of the head coaches they had during their existence. The franchise moved to Phoenix, Arizona in 1996 and became the Arizona Coyotes.

John Paddock coached the most games, with 106 wins, 138 losses, and 249 points.

Key

Head coaches

Notes
 A running total of the number of coaches of the Jets. Thus, any coach who have two or more separate terms as head coach is only counted once.
 Each year is linked to an article about that particular WHA or NHL season.
 These rows are inserted for the sortable stats.

References
General

Specific

National Hockey League coaches by team
coaches
Coaches